Meckler or Mekler is a surname of German origin that may refer to:

Alan Meckler (born 1945), American businessman
David Meckler (born 1987), American ice hockey player
Gabriel Mekler (1942–1977), American musician
Jackie Mekler (born 1932), South African athlete
Mark Meckler (born 1962), American political activist
Nancy Meckler (born 1947), American theatre director
Ruth Meckler (1937–2005), American pianist

See also 
Meckler-Allen 1912 Biplane
Mackler

German-language surnames